Evgeny Nifantiev (born 14 September 1978, Krasnoyarsk) is a Russian political figure and a deputy of the 8th State Duma. 

After graduating from the First Moscow State Medical University, Nifantiev founded and headed the pharmacy holding titled “Neopharm.” In 2005-2006, he held the position of head of the department for licensing, supervision and control of medical and pharmaceutical activities of the Office of the Federal Service for Surveillance in Healthcare (Moscow and the Moscow Oblast). In 2011, he was included in the reserve of managerial personnel under the patronage of the President of Russia. In 2019, he became a member of the Civic Chamber of Moscow. Since September 2021, he has served as the deputy of the 8th State Duma.

References

1978 births
Living people
United Russia politicians
21st-century Russian politicians
Eighth convocation members of the State Duma (Russian Federation)
Politicians from Krasnoyarsk